James Bell (November 13, 1804May 26, 1857) was an American politician and a United States Senator from New Hampshire from 1855 until his death in 1857.

Early life
Born in Francestown, New Hampshire, Bell graduated from Bowdoin College in 1822, studied law at Litchfield Law School, and was admitted to the bar in 1825 and began practice in Gilmanton, New Hampshire.

Career
From 1831 to 1846 Bell practiced in Exeter, and was a member of the New Hampshire House of Representatives from 1846 to 1850. He was a delegate to the State constitutional convention in 1850, and ran unsuccessfully for Governor of New Hampshire in 1854 and 1855.

Elected as a Republican in July 1855, replacing John S. Wells, who had been appointed following the death of Moses Norris, Jr.  Bell served in the United States Senate during the Thirty-fourth United States Congress from July 30, 1855 until his death in 1857.

Death and legacy
Bell died in Laconia, New Hampshire on May 26, 1857 (age 52 years, 194 days). He is interred at the Exeter Cemetery in Exeter, New Hampshire. There is a cenotaph in his honor at the Congressional Cemetery, Washington, D.C.

Family life
The son of Samuel Bell and Mehitable Dana Bell, he was the uncle of Samuel Newell Bell and the cousin of Charles Henry Bell. He married Judith A. Upham in 1831 and they had five children, Mary A. Bell White, Eliza U. Bell, Lucy Bell, James Dana Bell, and Charles Upham Bell.

See also
List of United States Congress members who died in office (1790–1899)

References

External links

Portraits of State and National Legislators and Others On the First Floor of The State House: James Bell

1804 births
1857 deaths
Republican Party United States senators from New Hampshire
Members of the New Hampshire House of Representatives
New Hampshire lawyers
Phillips Academy alumni
Bowdoin College alumni
New Hampshire Whigs
19th-century American politicians
New Hampshire Oppositionists
New Hampshire Republicans
Opposition Party United States senators
19th-century American lawyers